Tetrabromoethane (TBE) is a halogenated hydrocarbon, chemical formula C2H2Br4. Although three bromine atoms may bind to one of the carbon atoms creating 1,1,1,2-tetrabromoethane this is not thermodynamically favorable, so in practice tetrabromoethane is equal to 1,1,2,2-tetrabromoethane, where each carbon atom binds two bromine atoms.

Uses
It has an unusually high density for an organic compound, near 3 g/mL, due largely to the four bromine atoms. TBE is a liquid at room temperature, and is used to separate mineral ores from its supporting rock by means of preferential flotation. Quartz, feldspar, calcite, dolomite and other minerals with low density will float in TBE, while minerals such as sphalerite, galena and pyrite will sink. A related compound, bromoform, is also sometimes used in these applications, however, TBE is more practical because of its wider liquid range and lower vapor pressure.

Safety
Permissible exposure limit is 1 ppm.  Cases of acute TBE poisoning are known as well.

References

Bromoalkanes